Spider's Web is a 2002 American direct-to-video film directed by Paul Levine and starring Stephen Baldwin and Kari Wuhrer. The film, described as a "low-rent sex thriller", was also produced by both Baldwin and Wuhrer.

Production
Wuhrer said of the film: "The pace of making this movie, it was extreme. It was the longest day imaginable". Wuhrer's breast implants encapsulated during filming, which she noticed while preparing to film a nude scene, so she had them removed later that year. She noted that both Levine and Baldwin were compassionate about her ordeal, and worked to continue filming in ways that would conceal the disfigurement.

Plot
Clay Harding (Baldwin) recruits executive Lauren Bishop (Wuhrer) in a plot to steal $40 million from Harding's father Robert Harding (George Murdock). The pair devise a plot to steal Robert's passwords and set up a dummy corporation mimicking a company that Robert is interested in buying in order to divert his funds to a Swiss bank account. Clay secretly plans to double-cross Laura and allow her to take the blame for the theft, which she realizes when she discovers that a co-worker who had engineered her being fired from her job, Harry Burnham (Benjamin King), was Clay's college classmate. Clay murders Burnham and makes it look like a suicide. However, after a series of machinations on both sides, Lauren ultimately prevails, leaving the country with access to the money while Clay is left with nothing.

Cast

Reception
The movie was critically panned as "boring", with one review summarizing it as repeated episodes of "some drama and story followed by nudity and sex which in the end makes this movie all about how sexy actress Kari Wuhrer is". Scott Weinberg, writing for Apollo Guide, wrote "I suppose if a movie has entirely vanished from memory not 24 hours after it's been viewed, that's its own review right there".

References

External links
 

2002 crime thriller films
2002 films
2002 direct-to-video films
American crime thriller films
2000s English-language films
2000s American films